Dybt vand (English: Deep Water) is a 1999 Danish TV movie thriller directed by Ole Bornedal. It was broadcast by DR1. It involves a deputy mayor (played by Jens Jørn Spottag) who bends the rules and gets involved in multiple crimes, creating a domino effect of consequences.

Cast 
 Jens Jørn Spottag
 
 Henning Moritzen
 Søren Sætter-Lassen
 Gerda Gilboe
 Gyrd Løfqvist
 Ulf Pilgaard
 
 Ditte Gråbøl
 Bjarne Henriksen
 Niels Anders Thorn
 Ulrich Thomsen
 
 
 
 
 
 Beate Bille

References

External links 
 Official website at dr.dk/bonanza
 

1990s thriller films
1999 films
1999 television films
Danish thriller films
Films directed by Ole Bornedal
Films scored by Marco Beltrami
Thriller television films
1990s Danish-language films